In geometry, a prismatic compound of antiprism is a category of uniform polyhedron compound. Each member of this infinite family of uniform polyhedron compounds is a symmetric arrangement of antiprisms sharing a common axis of rotational symmetry.

Infinite family 
This infinite family can be enumerated as follows:
For each positive integer n≥1 and for each rational number p/q>3/2 (expressed with p and q coprime), there occurs the compound of n p/q-gonal antiprisms, with symmetry group:
Dnpd if nq is odd
Dnph if nq is even

Where p/q=2, the component is the tetrahedron (or dyadic antiprism). In this case, if n=2 then the compound is the stella octangula, with higher symmetry (Oh).

Compounds of two antiprisms 
Compounds of two n-antiprisms share their vertices with a 2n-prism, and exist as two alternated set of vertices.

Cartesian coordinates for the vertices of an antiprism with n-gonal bases and isosceles triangles are

with k ranging from 0 to 2n−1; if the triangles are equilateral,

Compound of two trapezohedra (duals) 
The duals of the prismatic compound of antiprisms are compounds of trapezohedra:

Compound of three antiprisms
For compounds of three digonal antiprisms, they are rotated 60 degrees, while three triangular antiprisms are rotated 40 degrees.

References 
.

Polyhedral compounds